The Czech Republic–Slovakia football rivalry is a highly competitive sports rivalry exists between the national football teams of the two countries, as well as their respective sets of fans. Games between the two teams, even those that are only friendly matches, are often marked by notable and sometimes controversial incidents; though the rivalry is mostly described as friendly and closeness because of historical tie. These matches are also called "Federal derby" or lesser extent, "Brother derby", due to cultural common between both countries.

Czechoslovakia national football team
The Czechoslovakia national football team was the national association football team of Czechoslovakia from 1922 to 1993. At the dissolution of Czechoslovakia at the end of 1992, the team was participating in UEFA qualifying Group 4 for the 1994 World Cup; it completed this campaign under the name Representation of Czechs and Slovaks (RCS). The Czech Republic national football team is recognised by FIFA and UEFA as the successor of the Czechoslovakia team.

The Czechoslovakia team was controlled by the Czechoslovak Football Association. The team had two runner-up finishes in World Cups (1934, 1962) and a European Championship win in 1976. Czechoslovakia qualified for the final stages of the 1990 World Cup and shortly afterwards their national coach Jozef Vengloš moved to England to become Aston Villa manager.

List of matches

Statistics

Games

See also 
 Czechoslovakia national football team
 Czech Republic national football team
 Slovakia national football team
 Czech Republic–Slovakia ice hockey rivalry

International association football rivalries
Regional rivalries
Sports rivalries
Slovakia rivalry
Czech Republic rivalry